Margaret Catchpole (14 March 1762 – 13 May 1819) was a Suffolk servant girl, chronicler and deportee to Australia. Born in Suffolk, she worked as a servant in various houses before being convicted of stealing a horse and later escaping from Ipswich Gaol. Following her capture, she was transported to the Australian penal colony of New South Wales, where she remained for the rest of her life. Her entry in the Australian Dictionary of Biography describes her as "one of the few true convict chroniclers with an excellent memory and a gift for recording events".

Early life
Catchpole was reputedly born at Nacton, Suffolk, the daughter of Elizabeth Catchpole and according to one source of Jonathan Catchpole, head ploughman.

Catchpole had little education and worked as a servant for different families until being employed  in May 1793 as under-nurse and under-cook by the writer Elizabeth Cobbold at her house on St Margarets Green in Ipswich. Her husband was a brewer and member of the prosperous Ipswich Cobbold family. Here Catchpole was virtually part of the family and was responsible for saving the lives of children in her care three times. She also learned to read and write here.

According to the 1949 Dictionary of Australian Biography (DAB1949), not be confused with the Australian Dictionary of Biography, she once rode bareback into Ipswich as a child to fetch a doctor, guiding the horse with a halter. The source also states that she had fallen in love with a sailor named William Laud, who had joined a band of smugglers; later he was pressed into service in the navy. And that Laud was trying to persuade Catchpole to travel in a boat with him when another admirer of Margaret, John Barry, came to her assistance and a fight ensued, Barry was shot by Laud. Barry recovered, but a price was put on Laud's head.

Criminal conviction
In mid-1795 Catchpole left the Cobbolds and became ill and was unemployed. After being told by a man named Cook that Laud was back in London, Cook persuaded Catchpole to steal a horse and ride it to London to meet her former lover – Cook's plan was to sell the horse for his own benefit. On the night of 23 May 1797 Catchpole stole John Cobbold's coach gelding and rode the horse  to London in nine hours, but was promptly arrested for its theft and tried at Suffolk Summer Assizes.

According to DAB1949 she pleaded guilty at her trial, and after evidence regarding her previous good character had been given, was asked if she had anything to say why sentence of death should not be passed upon her. She spoke with firmness, regretting her fault but not praying for mercy. Even when the death sentence was pronounced she remained composed until she saw her old father crying in the court.

Her sentence was commuted to transportation for seven years and she was detained in Ipswich Gaol. After three years she escaped by using a clothesline to scale the 22-foot (6.7 m) wall. Margaret was recaptured on a Suffolk beach and sentenced to death, later reduced to transportation for seven years. She arrived in Sydney on the Nile on 15 December 1801.

Australia

Margaret Catchpole's life in Australia was relatively uneventful. After the death of her lover, Margaret had resolved never to marry and in Sydney she refused the addresses of George Caley. Later she was employed as the overseer of a farm, and while in the country became a midwife, and also kept a small farm of her own. She was happy and respected, and in a letter written to England in about 1807 she says with pardonable pride "all my quantances are my betters"—she had little education and her spelling was always her own. She was pardoned on 31 January 1814 but did not return to England.

Little is known about the last 10 years of her life, but she continued her nursing, died on 13 May 1819 after catching influenza from a shepherd she was nursing. She was buried in the graveyard of St Peter's church at Richmond, New South Wales.

Legacy
Catchpole's letters of 8 October 1806 and 8 October 1809 are the only known eyewitness accounts of the Hawkesbury River floods of those years. She described in graphic detail the countryside, the Aboriginals, and the wildlife; she wrote of the first convict coalminers at Coal River (Newcastle) and of the savagery and immorality of the inhabitants of the colony at the time; her writings added greatly to Australia's early history.

The Margaret Catchpole Public House is situated on Cliff Lane close the site of the Cobbold Brewery in Ipswich.

Carol Birch's 2007 novel Scapegallows is based on Catchpole's life.

Fact and fiction
Rev. Richard Cobbold (son of her former employers) made Catchpole the subject of a novel, The History of Margaret Catchpole (London, 1845), which has often been reprinted. The author claims that "the public may depend upon the truth of the main features of this narrative" however some discrepancies have since come to light and some writers, including the Rev. M. G. Watkins, author of the memoir in the Dictionary of National Biography, appear to have taken this source too literally.

Notable discrepancies:
Education: Richard Cobbold made her speak and write as a well-educated woman throughout the book although the evidence is that she was uneducated.
Marriage: He has claims that she married in 1812 however she herself claims that she was unmarried in a letter dated 2 September 1811.
Year of death: He claims that she did not die until 1841, however the register of burials at Richmond states "Margaret Catchpole, aged 57 years, came prisoner in the Nile, in the year 1801. Died May 13; was buried May 14, 1819."— Henry Fulton.

A popular drama based on her life, "Margaret Catchpole, the Female Horse Stealer!" was produced in London .

Cobbold's book was adapted into an 1887 play, An English Lass, starring Lily Dampier as Catchpole. This play formed the basis of the 1912 film The Romantic Story of Margaret Catchpole which starred Lottie Lyell in the title role.

Cobbold's book was also adapted into a libretto by Ronald Fletcher which was set to music as the opera "Margaret Catchpole: Two Worlds Apart" by British composer Stephen Dodgson in 1979.

The Romantic Story of Margaret Catchpole is a 1911 Australian silent film, directed by Raymond Longford and starring Lottie Lyell. Only part of the movie survives today.

In 1966 Ruth Manning-Sanders published The Extraordinary Margaret Catchpole, a novel for children which concentrates on her life before she was deported.

The Australian children's author, Nance Donkin (born on 7 March 1915 at Maitland, New South Wales: died age 93, on 18 April 2008 at Canterbury, Victoria) wrote Margaret Catchpole (illustrated by Edwina Bell illustrator: Sydney: Collins, 1974). This was an illustrated Young Adult or children's version of the Margaret Catchpole story, about a pioneering convict woman and her life after emancipation, derived largely from Richard Cobbold's biographical Victorian novel, The History of Margaret Catchpole (1845). Local East Suffolk (Benhall) folk group Honey and the Bear feature a song about the life of Margaret Catchpole on their 2019 album Made in the Aker.

See also
 List of 18th-century British working-class writers
 List of convicts transported to Australia

References

Further reading
Salmonson, Jessica Amanda. (1991) The Encyclopedia of Amazons. Paragon House. Page 51. 

1762 births
1819 deaths
18th-century English criminals
English diarists
Convicts transported to Australia
People from Nacton
Recipients of British royal pardons
Women diarists
Criminals from Suffolk
British people convicted of theft
Australian convict women
Female